Fariab-e Kalamak (also Romanized as Fārīāb-e Kalamak; also known as Fārīāb) is a village in Chin Rural District, Ludab District, Boyer-Ahmad County, Kohgiluyeh and Boyer-Ahmad Province, Iran. At the 2006 census, its population was 24, in 4 families.

References 

Populated places in Boyer-Ahmad County